Bartholomew I Ghisi (died 1303) was the Venetian hereditary lord of the islands of Tenos and Mykonos in the Cyclades in Frankish Greece. He was the son of the conqueror of these islands, Andrea Ghisi, and lived to a very advanced age (he is recorded as "very old" in 1290). He was succeeded by his son, George I Ghisi.

Sources 
 
 

13th-century births
1303 deaths
Lords of Tinos and Mykonos
Ghisi family
13th-century Venetian people
14th-century Venetian people